Lucius Richard O'Brien (or L. R. O'Brien as he was known)  (15 August 1832 – 13 December 1899) was an influential 19th-century Canadian oil and watercolour landscape artist.

Life and career

Lucius O'Brien  was born in Shanty Bay, Upper Canada, a village his father founded on the shore of Lake Simcoe.

His father was Edward George O'Brien R.N who retired from the Navy in 1830 and went out to Canada and settled in Shanty Bay. He became a J.P and Colonel of Militia. He married Sophie Gapper and died in 1875. He was a descendant of Sir Edward O'Brien, 2nd Baronet. 

He graduated from Upper Canada College in 1847 and is said to have directly started work in an architect's office where he did drafting. In 1852, he won two prizes at the Ontario Provincial Exhibition for painting. In 1856, he was listed as an artist in Toronto's City Directory.

In 1872, Lucius began landscape painting, and quickly excelled in the genre. Two year later, after a dispute with artist John Arthur Fraser, O'Brien took Fraser's position as vice-president of the Ontario Society of Artists, a position he held until 1880, when he became founding President of the Royal Canadian Academy of Arts.

He is best known for landscape paintings from across Canada in oil and watercolour, such as, Sunrise on the Saguenay of 1880, which was the first academy diploma piece in the Royal Canadian Academy's first annual exhibition.

In 1880, O'Brien began to work on Picturesque Canada (1882–84), which he edited. O'Brien toured across Canada, meeting with the country's artists and commissioned artists to produce woodblock prints for illustration of the text. O'Brien's art, and in particular Picturesque Canada, aimed to celebrated Canada's natural landscape united under confederation.

O'Brien was one of the first artists invited to travel to and paint the Rocky Mountains on the newly completed Canadian Pacific Railway in 1886.

He died in Toronto, Ontario at the age of 67.

Notes

References

References
 Harper, Russell. Painting in Canada: A History. 2nd Edition. Toronto: University of Toronto Press, 1981. 
 Reid, Dennis. A Concise History of Canadian Painting. 2nd Edition. Toronto: Oxford University Press, 1988. .

External links

Examples of O'Brien's landscapes from the National Gallery of Canada's image database Cybermuse.
Biography at the Dictionary of Canadian Biography Online

1832 births
1899 deaths
19th-century Canadian painters
Canadian male painters
Canadian landscape painters
Canadian engineers
19th-century Canadian male artists
Members of the Royal Canadian Academy of Arts